Gerardo d'Anguilara served as bailli of the Principality of Achaea for its absent Prince, John of Gravina, from 1331–1332.

References

Sources
 

14th-century Italian politicians
Baillis of the Principality of Achaea
14th-century people from the Principality of Achaea